Jordan Veasy (born June 23, 1995) is an American football wide receiver for the Seattle Sea Dragons of the XFL. He played college football at California and signed as an undrafted free agent with the Tennessee Titans in 2018. He has been a member of several other NFL teams.

Professional career

Tennessee Titans
Veasy signed with the Tennessee Titans as an undrafted free agent on May 11, 2018, but was waived on September 1, 2018. The BC Lions traded for his CFL rights September 8, 2018.

Jacksonville Jaguars
On December 18, 2018, Veasy was signed to the Jacksonville Jaguars practice squad.

Indianapolis Colts
On January 14, 2019, Veasy signed a reserve/future contract with the Indianapolis Colts. He was on waived August 31, 2019.

Buffalo Bills
On September 25, 2019, Veasy was signed to the Buffalo Bills practice squad. He was released on October 1, but re-signed on October 14, only to be released three days later.

Washington Redskins / Football Team
On December 4, 2019, Veasy was signed to the Washington Redskins practice squad. Veasy partially attributed his signing to his taking part in a highly publicized workout with Colin Kaepernick on November 16. He was signed to a reserve/future contract on December 30, 2019. Veasy was placed on injured reserve on September 5, 2020, before being waived on October 6, 2020.

Houston Texans
On July 29, 2021, Veasy signed with the Houston Texans. He was released on August 31, 2021 and re-signed to the practice squad.

Las Vegas Raiders
On May 20, 2022, Veasy signed with the Las Vegas Raiders. He was released on August 10, 2022.

Seattle Sea Dragons
The Seattle Sea Dragons selected Veasy in the eighth round of the 2023 XFL Supplemental Draft on January 1, 2023.

References

External links 
California Golden Bears profile

1995 births
Living people
American football wide receivers
Buffalo Bills players
California Golden Bears football players
Golden West Rustlers football players
Houston Texans players
Indianapolis Colts players
Faulkner Eagles football players
Jacksonville Jaguars players
Las Vegas Raiders players
Pittsburgh Steelers players
Players of American football from Alabama
Seattle Sea Dragons players
Sportspeople from Gadsden, Alabama
Tennessee Titans players
Washington Redskins players
Washington Football Team players